Zeev Suraski is an Israeli programmer, PHP developer and co-founder of Zend Technologies. A graduate of the Technion in Haifa, Israel, Suraski and Andi Gutmans created PHP 3 in 1997. In 1999 they wrote the Zend Engine, the core of PHP 4, and founded Zend Technologies, which has since overseen PHP advances. The name Zend is a portmanteau of their forenames, Zeev and Andi.

Suraski is an emeritus member of the Apache Software Foundation, and was nominated for the FSF Award for the Advancement of Free Software in 1999. Zeev Suraski was the Chief technology officer for Zend Technologies until he left the company in August 2019.
On October 17, 2018, he announced his intention of leaving Zend Technologies as Rogue Wave Software, which acquired Zend Technologies in 2015, decided to change the strategic focus of the company.
Since August 2019 he's the Chief technology officer of Strattic.

He was the lead contributor to PHP from 1997 onwards.

References

Living people
Businesspeople in software
Israeli computer programmers
Israeli chief executives
Israeli Jews
PHP writers
Web developers
Year of birth missing (living people)